Aralkylamine dehydrogenase (azurin) (aromatic amine dehydrogenase, arylamine dehydrogenase, tyramine dehydrogenase) is an enzyme with the systematic name aralkylamine:azurin oxidoreductase (deaminating). This enzyme catalyses the following chemical reaction:

 ArCH2NH2 + H2O + 2 azurin  ArCHO + NH3 + 2 reduced azurin

The three substrates of this enzyme are RCH2NH2 (i.e., an aromatic amine), water, and the acceptor azurin, and its three products are RCHO, ammonia, and a reduced acceptor. Azurin can be replaced with the artificial acceptor phenazine methosulfate in in vitro studies.

This quinoprotein enzyme belongs to the family of oxidoreductases, specifically those acting on the CH-NH2 group of donors with other acceptors. This enzyme participates in tyrosine metabolism and phenylalanine metabolism. It is notable for its chemical mechanism, which is dominated by proton tunneling.

References 

EC 1.4.9
Enzymes of known structure